This page is a list of lists of lists—a list of pages that are lists of other list articles. Each of the pages linked here is an index to multiple lists on a topic. Some of the linked pages may contain lists of lists as well.

General reference
 List of lists of lists: This article itself is a list of lists, so it contains itself.
 Lists of academic journals
 Lists of important publications in science
 Lists of problems
 Lists of unsolved problems

Culture and the arts

Literature
 Lists of books
 List of top books lists
 Lists of banned books
 Lists of The New York Times Fiction Best Sellers
 Lists of The New York Times Non-Fiction Best Sellers
 Publishers Weekly lists of bestselling novels in the United States
 Lists of dystopian works
 Lists of LGBT figures in fiction and myth
 Lists of writers
 List of African writers by country
 Lists of American writers
 Lists of Slovak authors
 List of women writers

Mythology
 Lists of deities
 Lists of deities by cultural sphere
 Lists of demons
 Lists of legendary creatures

Philosophy
 Index of philosophy
 Lists of philosophers
 Lists about skepticism

Art and the arts

Characters
 Lists of advertising characters
 Lists of characters in a fictional work
 Lists of Coronation Street characters
 Lists of CSI characters
 Lists of DC Comics characters
 Lists of Emmerdale characters
 Lists of General Hospital characters
 Lists of Hollyoaks characters
 Lists of horror film characters
 Lists of Marvel Comics characters
 Lists of Marvel Cinematic Universe cast members
 Lists of Stargate characters
 Lists of The Office characters
 Lists of The Walking Dead characters
 Lists of Transformers characters
 Lists of fictional Presidents of the United States
 Lists of superheroes
 Lists of villains

Fictional elements
 Timelines of the future
 Lists of fictional locations
 Lists of fictional species
 Lists of fictional animals
 Lists of legendary creatures
 Lists of dragons
 Lists of vampires
 Lists of fictional humanoid species
 Lists of fictional hybrids
 Lists of Star Wars species

Performing arts
 Lists of a cappella groups
 Lists of actors
 Lists of actors by television series
 Lists of Indian actors
 Lists of albums
 Lists of UK Compilation Chart number-one albums
 Lists of anime
 Lists of Canadian game shows
 Lists of comedians
 Lists of composers
 Chronological lists of classical composers
 Chronological lists of classical composers by nationality
 Lists of concert tours
 Lists of Desert Island Discs episodes
 Lists of films
 Lists of animated films
 Lists of box office number-one films
 Lists of box office number-one films in the United States
 Lists of box office number-one films in the United Kingdom
 Lists of feature film series
 Lists of film remakes
 Lists of film spin-offs
 Lists of films based on location
 Lists of films based on mythology
 Lists of films by country
 Lists of American films
 Lists of Argentine films
 Lists of Australian films
 Lists of Austrian films
 Lists of Azerbaijani films
 Lists of Belgian films
 Lists of Brazilian films
 Lists of British films
 Lists of Bulgarian films
 Lists of Cambodian films of the 2000s
 Lists of Chinese films
 Lists of Czech and Slovak films
 Lists of Czech films
 Lists of Danish films
 Lists of Dutch films
 Lists of Estonian films
 Lists of Egyptian films
 Lists of Finnish films
 Lists of French films
 Lists of Georgian films
 Lists of German films
 Lists of Hong Kong films
 Lists of Hungarian films
 Lists of Indian films
 Lists of Assamese-language films
 Lists of Bengali films
 Lists of Bollywood films
 Lists of Indian Punjabi films
 Lists of Malayalam films
 Lists of Tamil-language films
 Lists of Telugu-language films
 Lists of Iranian films
 Lists of Israeli films
 Lists of Italian films
 Lists of Japanese films
 Lists of Korean films
 Lists of South Korean films
 Lists of Malaysian films
 Lists of Mexican films
 Lists of Norwegian films
 Lists of Pakistani films
 Lists of Philippine films
 Lists of Polish films
 Lists of Portuguese films
 Lists of Soviet films
 Lists of Spanish films
 Lists of Sri Lankan films
 Lists of Swedish films
 Lists of Turkish films
 Lists of films by genre
 Lists of action films
 Lists of adventure films
 Lists of animated feature films
 Lists of avant-garde films
 Lists of comedy films
 Lists of crime films
 Lists of erotic films
 Lists of fantasy films
 Lists of horror films
 Lists of LGBT-related films
 Lists of science fiction films
 Lists of thriller films
 Lists of Western films
 Lists of films by studio
 Lists of films released by Disney
 Lists of highest-grossing films
 Lists of works of fiction made into feature films
 Lists of Gladiators events
 Lists of Hispanic Academy Award winners and nominees by country
 Lists of music by theme
 Lists of music inspired by literature
 List of musical instruments by Hornbostel–Sachs number
 Lists of musicals
 Lists of musicians
 Lists of blues musicians by genre
 Lists of pianists
 Lists of violinists
 Lists of operas
 Lists of singers
 Lists of songs
 Lists of Geordie song-related topics
 Lists of UK number one singles
 Lists of Television Episodes
 Lists of American television episodes with LGBT themes
 Lists of Arrowverse episodes
 Lists of Big Brother episodes
 Lists of Blue's Clues episodes
 Lists of Cosmos episodes
 Lists of CSI episodes
 Lists of Dallas episodes
 Lists of Doctor Doctor episodes
 Lists of Doctor Who episodes
 Lists of Doraemon episodes
 Lists of Inazuma Eleven episodes
 Lists of Knight Rider episodes
 Lists of One Piece episodes
 Lists of Pokémon episodes
 Lists of Powerpuff Girls episodes
 Lists of Scooby-Doo episodes
 Lists of Star Trek episodes
 Lists of Stargate episodes
 Lists of Teenage Mutant Ninja Turtles episodes
 Lists of The Twilight Zone episodes
 Lists of This American Life episodes
 Lists of television programs
 Lists of animated television series
 Lists of Canadian television series
 Lists of Canadian network television schedules
 Lists of C-SPAN Q&A interviews
 Lists of television programs with LGBT characters
 Lists of television specials
 Lists of Christmas television episodes
 Lists of The Simpsons publications
 Lists of Stargate topics
 Lists of theatres

Visual arts
 Lists of artists
 Lists of painters
 Lists of painters by nationality
 Lists of women artists
 Lists of colors
 Lists of comics
 Lists of DC Comics publications
 Lists of manga
 Lists of Marvel Comics publications
 Lists of webcomics
 Lists of public art
 Lists of monuments and memorials

Entertainment and recreation

Festivals
 Lists of festivals

Games
 Lists of games
 Lists of video games
 Lists of best-selling video games by platform
 Lists of free games
 Lists of games considered the best
 Lists of Nintendo games
 Lists of Game Boy games
 Lists of Virtual Console games
 Lists of PlayStation games
 Lists of PlayStation Store games
 Lists of PlayStation Vita games
 Lists of PS one Classics
 Lists of Sega games
 Lists of video game characters
 Lists of Grand Theft Auto characters
 Lists of Nintendo characters
 Lists of video game companies
 Lists of video game consoles

Sports
 Lists of association football clubs
 Lists of Australian rules football leagues
 Lists of curling clubs
 Lists of hat-tricks
 Lists of high school football rivalries
 Lists of international rugby football teams
 List of Minor League Baseball lists
 Lists of National Football League team seasons
 Lists of player transfers
 Lists of Danish football transfers 2008–09
 Lists of Danish football transfers 2009–10
 Lists of Italian football transfers 2007–08
 Lists of sports venues
 Lists of baseball parks
 Lists of stadiums
 Lists of sportspeople
 Lists of Albanian athletes
 Lists of American football players
 Lists of College Football Hall of Fame inductees
 Lists of association football players
 Lists of England international footballers
 Lists of foreign footballers in Japan
 Lists of current NHL team rosters
 Lists of golfers
 Lists of Maccabiah Games medalists
 Lists of Olympic medalists
 Lists of Paralympic medalists
 Lists of rodeo performers
 Lists of sportspeople who died during their careers
 Lists of tennis players
 Lists of wrestlers
 Status lists of players in professional sports
 Lists of Swedish Swimming Championships champions
 Lists of tennis records and statistics
 Sri Lanka cricket lists

Food and drink
 Lists of food and beverage topics
 Lists of beverages
 Lists of breweries
 Lists of foods
 Lists of prepared foods
 Lists of restaurants

Mass media
 Lists of encyclopedias
 Lists of highest-grossing films
 Lists of magazines
 Lists of newspapers
 Lists of online videos
 Lists of radio stations
 Lists of record labels
 Lists of television channels
 Lists of television channels in India
 Lists of television stations in North America
 Lists of television stations in the United States
 Lists of television programs by episode count

Geography and places

Manmade geographical features

Countries and regions
 Lists of borders
 Lists of counties
 Lists of counties in the United States
 Lists of Scottish counties by population
 Lists of countries and territories
 Lists of African Union members
 Lists of countries by mineral production
 Lists of former Soviet Republics
 Lists by country
 Lists of country-related topics
 Lists of Zambia-related topics
 Lists of divisions in Dorset
 Lists of non-sovereign nations
 Lists of Quebec-related topics
 Lists of sovereign states and dependent territories
 Lists of political entities by century
 Lists of Spanish provinces
 Lists of Taiwanese counties and cities
 Lists of the Arab League
 Lists of time zones
 Lists of townlands of County Cork
 Lists of U.S. state topics
 Index of Alabama-related articles
 Index of Alaska-related articles
 Index of Arizona-related articles
 Index of Arkansas-related articles
 Index of California-related articles
 Index of Colorado-related articles
 Index of Connecticut-related articles
 Index of Delaware-related articles
 Index of Florida-related articles
 Index of Georgia-related articles
 Index of Idaho-related articles
 Index of Illinois-related articles
 Index of Indiana-related articles
 Index of Iowa-related articles
 Index of Kansas-related articles
 Index of Kentucky-related articles
 Index of Louisiana-related articles
 Index of Maine-related articles
 Index of Maryland-related articles
 Index of Massachusetts-related articles
 Index of Michigan-related articles
 Index of Minnesota-related articles
 Index of Mississippi-related articles
 Index of Missouri-related articles
 Index of Montana-related articles
 Index of Nebraska-related articles
 Index of Nevada-related articles
 Index of New Hampshire–related articles
 Index of New Jersey–related articles
 Index of New Mexico–related articles
 Index of New York (state)–related articles
 Index of North Carolina–related articles
 Index of North Dakota–related articles
 Index of Ohio-related articles
 Index of Oklahoma-related articles
 Lists of Oregon-related topics
 Index of Pennsylvania-related articles
 Index of Rhode Island–related articles
 Index of South Carolina–related articles
 Index of South Dakota–related articles
 Index of Tennessee-related articles
 Index of Texas-related articles
 Index of Utah-related articles
 Index of Vermont-related articles
 Index of Virginia-related articles
 Index of Washington (state)-related articles
 Index of Washington, D.C.–related articles
 Index of West Virginia–related articles
 Index of Wisconsin-related articles
 Index of Wyoming-related articles
 Ranked lists of Chilean regions

Places
 List of lists of buildings and structures in Puerto Rico
 Lists of heritage sites
 Lists of Bienes de Interés Cultural
 Lists of immovable heritage sites in Limburg (Belgium)
 Lists of Indian Monuments of National Importance
 Lists of protected heritage sites in Hainaut (province)
 Lists of protected heritage sites in Liège (province)
 Lists of protected heritage sites in Luxembourg (Belgium)
 Lists of protected heritage sites in Namur (province)
 Lists of protected heritage sites in Walloon Brabant
 Lists of World Heritage Sites
 Lists of landmarks
 Lists of National Treasures of Japan
 Lists of parks in Canada
 Lists of ports
 Lists of renamed places
 Lists of state parks by U.S. state
 Lists of tourist attractions
 Lists of tourist attractions in England
 Wonders of the World

Settlements
 Lists of capitals
 Lists of cities
 Lists of cities by country
 Lists of communes of France
 Lists of ghost towns in Canada
 Lists of places in Wales
 Lists of populated places in the United States
 Lists of Los Angeles topics
 Lists of New York City Landmarks
 Lists of New York City topics
 Lists of Omaha topics
 Lists of places in Kansas
 Lists of San Francisco topics
 Lists of U.S. cities with large ethnic identity populations
 Lists of U.S. cities with non-white majority populations
 Lists of municipalities
 Lists of neighborhoods by city
 Lists of places
 Lists of places by eponym
 Lists of rural localities in Russia
 Lists of towns
 Lists of towns and cities in England by population
 Lists of towns in Ireland
 Lists of twin towns and sister cities
 Lists of villages in Nigeria
 Lists of villages in Norway

Natural geographical features

Bodies of water
 Lists of lakes
 Lists of rivers
 Lists of waterways

Landforms
 Lists of extreme points
 Lists of highest points
 Lists of hills
 Lists of islands
 Lists of islands by name
 Lists of islands of the Americas
 Lists of islands of the European Union
 Lists of mountains
 Lists of mountains by region
 Lists of mountains and hills in the British Isles
 Lists of rocks in Western Australia
 Lists of volcanoes

History and events
 Lists of disasters
 List of accidents and disasters by death toll
 Lists of disasters in Indonesia
 List of pipeline accidents in the United States
 Lists of rail accidents
 List of rail accidents by country
 Lists of George Floyd protests
 Lists of incidents of unrest and violence in the United States by city
 Lists of occupations
 Lists of resignations
 Lists of tenants in the World Trade Center (1973–2001)
 List of timelines
 Lists of years by topic
 Phone hacking scandal reference lists

Mathematics and logic
 Lists of mathematics topics
 Lists of integrals
 Lists of shapes
 Lists of statistics topics
 Lists of unsolved problems in mathematics
 Lists of vector identities

Natural and physical sciences

Biology

 Lists of animals
 Lists of amphibians by region
 Lists of birds by region
 Lists of breeds
 Lists of cats
 Lists of dogs
 Lists of elephants
 Lists of extinct animals
 Lists of extinct animals of the British Isles
 Lists of Fauna of Denmark
 Lists of horses
 Lists of insects of Great Britain
 Lists of Lepidoptera by region
 Lists of mammals by population
 Lists of mammals by region
 Lists of organisms by population
 Lists of pigs
 Lists of reptiles by region
 Lists of reptiles of the United States
 Lists of sponges
 Lists of aquarium life
 Lists of biologists by author abbreviation
 Lists of dinosaur-bearing stratigraphic units
 Lists of dinosaur specimens
 Lists of dinosaur type specimens
 Lists of diseases
 Lists of animal diseases
 Lists of plant diseases
 Lists of cereal pests and diseases
 Lists of ecoregions
 Lists of ecoregions by country
 Lists of ecoregions in the United States
 Lists of environmental publications
 Lists of environmental topics
 Lists of fictional lifeforms
 Lists of fictional animals
 Lists of legendary creatures
 Lists of dragons
 Lists of vampires
 Lists of fictional hybrids
 Lists of fictional species
 Lists of fictional humanoid species
 Lists of Star Wars species
 Lists of fossiliferous stratigraphic units
 Lists of fossiliferous stratigraphic units in Africa
 Lists of fossiliferous stratigraphic units in Europe
 Lists of fossiliferous stratigraphic units in North America
 Lists of fossiliferous stratigraphic units in Canada
 Lists of fossiliferous stratigraphic units in the United States
 Lists of giants
 Lists of IUCN Red List species
 Lists of extinct animals
 Lists of IUCN Red List Critically Endangered species
 Lists of IUCN Red List data deficient species
 Lists of IUCN Red List endangered species
 Lists of IUCN Red List near threatened species
 Lists of IUCN Red List vulnerable species
 Lists of plants
 Lists of cultivars
 Lists of trees
 Lists of species 
 List of Araneidae species
 List of Asilidae species
 List of Euphorbia species
 Lists of invasive species
 Lists of Linyphiidae species

Physical sciences
 Lists of astronomical objects
 Lists of comets
 Lists of exoplanets
 Lists of galaxies
 Lists of geological features of the Solar System
 Lists of nebulae
 Lists of planets
 Lists of small Solar System bodies
 Lists of stars
 Lists of stars by constellation
 Lists of constellations
 Lists of earthquakes
 Lists of solar eclipses

Chemistry
 Carbon number
 Lists of metalloids
 List of data references for chemical elements

Meteorology
 Lists of Atlantic hurricanes
 Lists of Category 5 hurricanes
 Lists of tornadoes and tornado outbreaks
 Lists of United States tornadoes in 2009

Physics
 Lists of physics equations

People

 Lists of celebrities
 Lists of centenarians
 Lists of deaths by year
 Lists of ethnic groups
 Lists of black people
 Lists of heroes
 Lists of LGBT people
 Lists of bisexual people
 Lists of gay, lesbian, and bisexual people
 Lists of men
 Lists of most common surnames
 Lists of people by cause of death
 Lists of martyrs
 Lists of people executed in the United States
 Lists of people executed in Texas
 Lists of people by nationality
 Lists of Americans
 Lists of African Americans
 Lists of American Jews
 Lists of people from Kansas
 Lists of Armenians
 Lists of Australians
 Lists of Indigenous Australians
 Lists of British people by ethnic or national origin
 Lists of Britons
 Lists of Celts
 Lists of people from Camden
 Lists of people from London
 Lists of Dominicans
 Lists of Indian people
 Lists of indigenous peoples of Russia
 Lists of Israeli artists
 Lists of Jews by country
 Lists of people from African Union states
 Lists of people from Quebec by region
 Lists of Swedes
 Lists of people by occupation
 Lists of astronauts
 Lists of engineers
 Lists of Jews associated with literature and journalism
 Lists of Jews associated with the visual arts
 Lists of Jews in politics
 Lists of mathematicians
 Lists of Muslim scientists and scholars
 Lists of painters
 Lists of philosophers
 Lists of professional bodybuilders
 Lists of scientists
 Lists of sportspeople
 Lists of political families
 Lists of women

Religion and belief systems

 Lists of Armenian churches
 Lists of Bible stories
 Lists of Buddhist sites and traditions in Kerala
 Lists of cathedrals
 Lists of cathedrals in the United Kingdom
 Lists of Catholic church buildings
 List of churches in England
 Lists of Commissioners' churches
 Lists of places of worship in Chichester District
 Lists of places of worship in Wealden
 Lists of Coptic church buildings
 Lists of deities
 Lists of deities by cultural sphere
 Lists of holidays
 Lists of lists of people by belief
 Lists of atheists
 Lists of Christians
 Lists of Christian Scientists
 Lists of Roman Catholics
 Lists of venerable people
 Lists of Hindus
 Lists of Jews
 Lists of American Jews
 Lists of Muslims
 Lists of martyrs
 Lists of monasteries
 Lists of mosques
 Lists of New Testament minuscules
 Lists of papal encyclicals
 Lists of popes, patriarchs, primates, archbishops, and bishops
 List of creations of cardinals
 Lists of patriarchs

Society and social sciences

Archaeology
 Lists of hoards

Honors and awards
 Lists of 100 best books
 Lists of awards
 Lists of civil awards and decorations of the United States
 List of military decorations
 Lists of games considered the best
 Lists of Hispanic Academy Award winners and nominees by country
 Lists of Olympic medalists
 Lists of Paralympic medalists
 Lists of people by honor
 Lists of activists
 Lists of covers of Time magazine
 Lists of Nobel laureates
 Lists of people on the United States cover of Rolling Stone
 Special Honours Lists (Australia)
 Lists of The New York Times Fiction Best Sellers
 Lists of The New York Times Non-Fiction Best Sellers
 Lists of Victoria Cross recipients
 Publishers Weekly lists of bestselling novels in the United States

Linguistics
 Lists of abbreviations
 Lists of dictionaries
 Lists of English words
 Lists of collective nouns
 Lists of English words by country or language of origin
 Lists of English words of Celtic origin
 Lists of English words of Scottish origin
 Lists of Merriam-Webster's Words of the Year
 Lists of pejorative terms for people
 Lists of words having different meanings in American and British English
 Word lists by frequency
 Lists of etymologies
 Lists of North American place name etymologies
 Lists of U.S. county name etymologies
 Lists of things named after places
 Lists of ISO 639 codes
 Lists of languages
 Lists of endangered languages
 Lists of extinct languages
 List of Latin phrases
 Lists of medical eponyms
 Lists of names
 Lists of East Asian surnames
 Lists of Korean names
 Lists of most common surnames
 Lists of nicknames

Social institutions

Infrastructure
 List of bridges
 Lists of covered bridges
 Lists of bus routes in New York City
 Lists of canals
 Lists of cemeteries
 Lists of crossings
 Lists of crossings of the East River
 Lists of crossings of the Hudson River
 Lists of crossings of the Mississippi River
 Lists of mines
 Lists of mines in Canada
 Lists of mines in the United States
 Lists of named passenger trains
 Lists of New Jersey Transit bus routes
 Lists of pipelines
 List of pipeline accidents in the United States
 Lists of rail accidents
 List of rail accidents by country
 List of railway stations
 Lists of rapid transit systems
 List of roads and highways
 Lists of motorways and highways of Pakistan
 Lists of numbered highways in Washington
 Lists of roads in Toronto
 Lists of roads in the United Kingdom
 Lists of road junctions in the United Kingdom
 Lists of tunnels

Economy and business
 Lists of banks
 Lists of brands
 Lists of companies
 Lists of breweries
 Lists of companies by stock exchange listing
 Lists of companies listed on the New York Stock Exchange
 Lists of companies listed on the Toronto Stock Exchange
 List of companies of the United States by state
 Lists of distribution companies
 Lists of publishing companies
 Lists of video game companies
 Lists of corporate acquisitions and mergers
 Lists of corporate assets
 Lists of corporate headquarters by city
 Lists of countries by debt
 Lists of countries by GDP
 Lists of countries by GDP per capita
 Lists of countries by GNI per capita
 Lists of law firms
 Lists of most expensive items
 Lists of recessions

Education
 Lists of academic chancellors and vice chancellors
 Lists of Massachusetts Institute of Technology people
 Lists of schools
 Lists of boys' schools
 Lists of girls' schools
 Lists of law schools
 Lists of schools by country
 Lists of schools in Malaysia
 Lists of Chinese national-type primary schools in Malaysia
 Lists of educational institutions in Pakistan
 Lists of high schools in Paraguay
 Lists of schools in Australia
 Lists of schools in New South Wales
 Lists of schools in Queensland
 Lists of schools in Belgium
 Lists of schools in Canada
 Lists of schools in the Toronto District School Board
 Lists of schools in Hong Kong
 Lists of schools in New Zealand
 Lists of schools in South Africa
 Lists of schools in Sri Lanka
 Lists of government schools in Sri Lanka
 Lists of schools in the United Kingdom
 Lists of schools in England
 Lists of schools in Northern Ireland
 Lists of schools in Scotland
 Lists of schools in Wales
 Lists of schools in the United States
 Lists of Tamil national-type primary schools in Malaysia
 Lists of universities and colleges
 Lists of universities and colleges by country
 Lists of American universities and colleges
 List of institutions of higher education in India
 Lists of institutions of higher education by endowment size
 Lists of school districts in the United States
 List of school-related attacks
 Lists of university leaders
 Lists of schools in New South Wales

Government and politics
 Historical lists of Privy Counsellors
 Lists of active separatist movements
 Lists of diplomatic missions
 Lists of First Nations
 Lists of governments of Lithuania
 Lists of holidays
 Lists of legislation
 Lists of statutes of New Zealand
 Lists of libertarian topics
 Lists of lord lieutenancies
 Lists of national institutions and symbols
 Lists of national symbols
 Lists of newspaper endorsements in United States presidential elections
 Lists of office-holders
 Lists of ambassadors
 Lists of Canadian senators
 Lists of county governors of Norway
 Lists of current members of the Privy Council
 Lists of custodes rotulorum
 Lists of Danzig officials
 Lists of emperors
 Lists of female state governors
 Lists of Georgian monarchs
 Lists of Governors of Punjab
 Lists of Japanese Governors-General
 Lists of mayors by country
 Lists of monarchs
 Lists of ancient kings
 Lists of monarchs in the British Isles
 Lists of Irish kings
 Lists of Polish politicians
 Lists of presidents
 Lists of rulers of Djibouti
 Lists of rulers of Ethiopia
 Lists of rulers of Germany
 Lists of rulers of Ghana
 Lists of rulers of Greece
 Lists of rulers of India
 Lists of rulers of Ireland
 Lists of rulers of Italy
 Lists of rulers of Kenya
 Lists of rulers of Madagascar
 Lists of rulers of Spain
 Lists of state leaders
 Lists of state leaders by age
 Lists of state leaders by year
 Lists of United States congress
 Lists of United States state symbols
 Lists of Washington initiatives
 Political lists

Law
 Former FBI Ten Most Wanted Fugitives
 Lists of habeas petitions filed on behalf of War on Terror detainees
 Lists of killings by law enforcement officers in the United States
 Lists of landmark court decisions
 Lists of Pakistan Supreme Court cases
 Lists of people executed in the United States
 Lists of people executed in Texas
 List of solved missing person cases
 Lists of Supreme Court Justices
 List of United States crime-related lists
 Lists of United States Supreme Court cases
 Lists of United States Supreme Court cases by volume
 Lists of unsolved murders
 Outline of law
 Lists of case law
 Lists of legislation

War

 Lists of World War II topics
 Lists of World War II prisoner-of-war camps
 Lists of allied military operations of the Vietnam War
 List of American Civil War units by state
 Lists of battles
 Lists of Commandants of Cadets of the United States
 Lists of flying aces in Arab–Israeli wars
 Lists of former Guantanamo Bay detainees alleged to have returned to terrorism
 Lists of military commanders
 List of military decorations
 Lists of Palestinian rocket attacks on Israel
 List of timelines of wars
 Lists of Victoria Cross recipients
 List of Medal of Honor recipients
 Lists of wars
 Lists of wars in the 20th century
 Lists of World War I topics
 Lists of World War I flying aces

Technology and applied science

Aerospace
 Aviation lists
 Lists of aircraft
 Lists of airlines
 Lists of rockets
 Lists of rocket launches

Buildings
 Lists of airports
 Lists of buildings and structures
 Listed buildings in the United Kingdom
 Listed buildings in England
 Grade II* listed buildings in Buckinghamshire
 Grade II* listed buildings in Cambridgeshire
 Grade II* listed buildings in Cheshire
 Grade II* listed buildings in Cornwall
 Grade II* listed buildings in Cumbria
 Grade II* listed buildings in Derbyshire
 Grade II* listed buildings in Devon
 Grade II* listed buildings in Dorset
 Grade II* listed buildings in East Sussex
 Grade II* listed buildings in Gloucestershire
 Grade II* listed buildings in Hampshire
 Grade II* listed buildings in Herefordshire
 Grade II* listed buildings in Hertfordshire
 Grade II* listed buildings in Kent
 Grade II* listed buildings in Leicestershire
 Grade II* listed buildings in Lincolnshire
 Grade II* listed buildings in London
 Grade II* listed buildings in North Yorkshire
 Grade II* listed buildings in Oxfordshire
 Grade II* listed buildings in Shropshire
 Grade II* listed buildings in Staffordshire
 Grade II* listed buildings in Suffolk
 Grade II* listed buildings in Surrey
 Grade II* listed buildings in Warwickshire
 Grade II* listed buildings in West Yorkshire
 Listed buildings in Northern Ireland
 Listed buildings in Scotland
 Listed buildings in Wales
 List of castles
 List of castles by country
 Lists of castles in North America
 Lists of cathedrals
 Lists of cathedrals in the United Kingdom
 Lists of domes
 Lists of hillforts
 Lists of hotels
 Lists of lighthouses
 List of lighthouses in the United Kingdom
 List of museums
 List of museums by country
 List of real estate in Dubai
 Lists of royal residences
 Lists of shopping malls
 Lists of tallest buildings in New York
 Lists of works by Sharpe, Paley and Austin

Energy
 Lists of renewable energy topics
 Lists about renewable energy
 List of generating stations in Canada
 Lists of hydroelectric power stations
 Lists of offshore wind farms by country
 Lists of offshore wind farms by water area
 Lists of reservoirs and dams
 Lists of solar power stations
 Lists of wind farms
 Lists of wind farms by country
 List of windmills in the United Kingdom
 Lists of windmills in Sussex
 Lists of windmills in Yorkshire

Medicine
 List of cannabis-related lists
 Lists of drugs
 Lists of hospitals
 Lists of hospitals in Africa
 Lists of hospitals in Asia
 Lists of hospitals in Europe
 Lists of hospitals in North America
 Lists of hospitals in the United States
 Lists of hospitals in Oceania
 Lists of hospitals in South America
 Lists of medical eponyms

Maritime
 Lists of sail frigates
 Lists of ships
 Lists of Empire ships
 List of Liberty ships
 Lists of ships of the Turkish Navy
 Lists of shipwrecks
 Lists of U-boats
 Lists of watercraft types

Military
 Lists of accidents and incidents involving military aircraft
 Lists of armoured fighting vehicles
 List of artillery
 List of comparative military ranks
 List of commando units
 Lists of gun cartridges
 Lists of military aircraft by nation
 Lists of Bulgarian military aircraft
 List of military diving units
 Lists of military equipment
 Lists of currently active military equipment by country
 Lists of military installations
 List of military flags
 List of military special forces units
 Lists of naval flags
 List of paratrooper forces
 Lists of swords
 Lists of weapons
 Lists of World War II military equipment

Technology
 Lists of artificial objects sent into space
 Lists of automobile-related articles
 Lists of automobiles by performance
 Lists of computers
 Lists of microcomputers
 Lists of mobile computers
 Lists of country codes
 List of filename extensions
 Lists of network protocols
 Lists of North American area codes
 Lists of nuclear disasters and radioactive incidents
 Lists of programming languages
 Lists of software
 Lists of websites
 List of emerging technologies

Miscellaneous
 Lists of Dutch inventions and discoveries
 Lists of flags
 Lists of pairs
 Lists of replicas

See also
 Wikipedia:Contents/Lists

Notes